Conus infrenatus, common name the Jeffrey's Bay cone, is a species of sea snail, a marine gastropod mollusk in the family Conidae, the cone snails and their allies.

Like all species within the genus Conus, these snails are predatory and venomous. They are capable of "stinging" humans, therefore live ones should be handled carefully or not at all.

Description
The size of an adult shell varies between 24 mm and 50 mm. The shell is rosy white, encircled by articulated lines of chestnut and white spots. The apex is pink.

Distribution
This marine species occurs off Transkei and KwaZuluNatal, South Africa.

References

 Kilburn, R.N. & Rippey, E. (1982) Sea Shells of Southern Africa. Macmillan South Africa, Johannesburg, xi + 249 pp.
 Filmer R.M. (2001). A Catalogue of Nomenclature and Taxonomy in the Living Conidae 1758 – 1998. Backhuys Publishers, Leiden. 388pp.
 Tucker J.K. (2009). Recent cone species database. September 4, 2009 Edition

External links
 The Conus Biodiversity website
 
 Cone Shells – Knights of the Sea

infrenatus
Gastropods described in 1848